Drayton was a Legislative Assembly electorate in the state of Queensland, Australia.

History
Drayton was created by the 1910 Electoral Districts Act, taking effect at the 1912 elections. It consisted of the area around Toowoomba; the Electoral district of Drayton and Toowoomba was abolished in 1912.

Drayton was renamed Electoral district of Cunningham in 1923.

Members

The following people were elected in the seat of Drayton:

See also
 Electoral districts of Queensland
 Members of the Queensland Legislative Assembly by year
 :Category:Members of the Queensland Legislative Assembly by name

References

Former electoral districts of Queensland
1912 establishments in Australia
1923 disestablishments in Australia
Constituencies established in 1912
Constituencies disestablished in 1923